Rusape River is a long inland water river stretching from the almost evergreen Nyanga regions to Save river. It is known to be usually flooded during summer and has numerous myth stories associated with it. Rusape river is the major feeding river to Rusape dam in the outskirts of Rusape town.
Stream bank cultivation and illegal sand abstraction is contributing to siltation of Rusape river which flows into the Rusape dam. 

Rivers of Zimbabwe